Pesanggaran is a village in Bali in the Lesser Sunda Islands of Indonesia. It is located 3 miles outside Kuta on the south coast of the island.

Nearby towns and villages include Denpasar (4.0 nm), Pabeansanur (2.8 nm), Sanur (2.8 nm), Serangan (1.1 nm) and Ujung (1.1 nm).

References

Populated places in Bali